Sionascaig Lacus is one of a number of hydrocarbon seas and lakes found on Saturn's largest moon, Titan.
The lake is located at latitude 41.52°S and longitude 278.12°W on Titan's globe, and is composed of liquid methane and ethane. 
The feature is named for the Earth lake, Loch Sionascaig, in Scotland.

References

Lakes of Titan (moon)